Major-General Robert Gordon-Finlayson  (1916–2001) was a British Army officer.

Military career
Born the son of General Sir Robert Gordon-Finlayson, Gordon-Finlayson attended the Royal Military Academy, Woolwich, from where he was commissioned into the Royal Artillery on 27 August 1936. After serving in the Second World War, he became Commander Royal Artillery for 49th (North Midlands and West Riding) Division in June 1962, Deputy Quartermaster-General for British Army of the Rhine in August 1964 and General Officer Commanding 49th (North Midlands and West Riding) Division and North Midland District of the Territorial Army in December 1966. He went on to be General Officer Commanding East Midlands District in April 1967 before retiring in March 1970.

He was High Sheriff for Nottinghamshire in 1974.

References

1916 births
2001 deaths
British Army major generals
Officers of the Order of the British Empire
Royal Artillery officers
Graduates of the Royal Military Academy, Woolwich
British Army personnel of World War II